Meritxell Colell Aparicio (born in Barcelona in 1983) is a Spanish director.

Biography 
Meritxell Colell Aparicio graduated from Audiovisual Communication degree at Pompeu Fabra University in Barcelona. She studied cinema at the Universidad del Cine, en Buenos Aires. She started working as a film editor.

Since 2007, she has been making documentaries, notably for the Joan Miró Foundation. She also teaches cinema. She is a member of Cinema in Progress, a film education project, which also includes Carla Simón, Jonás Trueba and Mercedes Álvarez.

In 2018, she directed her first feature film, Con el viento, which is presented in competition at the Berlinale 2018 in the Forum section.

Meritxell Colell Aparicio is a part of the new generation of Spanish filmmaker. She is selected by the Cinéfondation to present her film at L'Atelier during the Cannes Festival.

Filmography 

 2005: Barcelona-París-Barcelona (documentary)
 2006: Manuscrit a la ciutat (documentary)
 2014: Arquitecturas en silencio, dialogue between Antoni Bonet and Le Corbusier (documentary)
 2008: Remembering Buenos Aires (documentary)
 2018: Con el viento (Face au vent), Polar Star Film

References

External links 

 Meritxell Colell Aparicio on IMDb
 Personal website

Spanish women film directors
Spanish documentary film directors
Spanish film directors
Spanish film producers
Spanish women screenwriters
People from Barcelona
1983 births
Living people
Women documentary filmmakers